Danielle Casanova (born Vincentella Perini; 9 January 1909 – 9 May 1943) was a French communist activist and member of the French Resistance during World War II. A dentist by occupation, she was a high-ranking figure within the Communist Youth and founded in 1936 its women's organisation  (UJFF, Union of Young French Women). Casanova was arrested on 15 February 1942 as she came to bring coal on a cold day to Georges Politzer and his wife; she had been involved in the organisation of actions against the German occupiers. First incarcerated at La Santé Prison in Paris, she was transferred to the Fort de Romainville for causing unrest with the help of fellow prisoners. Casanova was deported to Auschwitz on 24 January 1943, where she started working as a dentist at the camp infirmary but died of a typhus epidemic shortly thereafter. She was posthumously awarded the Legion of Honour.

Biography
Vincentella Périni was born on 9 January 1909 in Ajaccio, Corsica, her parents Olivier and Marie Hyacinthe (born Versini) were school teachers, as a child her nickname was Lella, she had three sisters and one brother André. After finishing secondary school she moved to Paris in November 1927 to study dentistry.

In 1928 she joined the Young Communist League of France. She began to call herself "Danielle" and quickly became Group Secretary to the Faculty of Medicine. Still studying, she joined the Central Committee of the movement at the Seventh Congress of June 1932, and took up its direction in February 1934 where she was the only woman. Faced with the rapid expansion of the Communist Youth, the Eighth Congress in Marseilles of 1936 charged her with creating the UJFF. This organisation, though still close to the Communist Youth, was aimed at creating a pacifist, anti-fascist movement. She was elected Secretary-General of the UJFF. At its First Congress in December 1936, she organised a collection of milk for malnourished Spanish children victims of the Civil War and help collect and ship relief supplies to Spanish republican forces.

In October 1938 Danielle served as leader of the French delegation to the United States at the World Congress of Youth for Peace, held at Vassar College. After the French Communist Youth was banned in September 1939, Danielle Casanova went into hiding. She founded the newspaper  (Hyphen). From October 1940, after the fall of France, she helped set up women's committees in the Paris region, while still writing for the underground press, especially  (Free Thought). She also founded  (Women's Voice). She organised demonstrations against the occupying forces, including the events of 8 November and 11 November 1940 caused by Professor Paul Langevin's arrest, and also the demonstration of 14 July 1941 that she organised.

On 11 February 1942 she is arrested by French Police while entering the hiding place of a Jewish couple, Georges Politzer and his wife Maï, at 170 bis, rue de Grenelle in the seventh arrondissement. French Police of the Special Anticommunist Brigade (BS) had been following Danielle Casanova since 23 January after spotting her carrying a big suitcase to that same building (it contained coal for the Politzer). They were all taken to the Special Brigade headquarter where they were interrogated until 23 March. Danielle managed to get a letter out to her mother.

At the end of March, she was moved to the German section of la Sante jail. On 24 August 1942 she was moved to the transit camp Fort de Romainville and transferred to the German authorities.

Transported to Auschwitz on 24 January 1943, inside the cattle cars of a train, she arrived three days later on 27 January. She was assigned to the camp infirmary Revier to work as a dentist on the Kapos. She helped other women from the Convoi des 31000 that brought them to Auschwitz, passing Maïe Politzer as a doctor and other women, including Madeleine Passot, as nurses. Even in jail and in concentration camp, Casanova did not stop campaigning, organizing clandestine publications and events. She died of typhus on 9 May 1943.

Legacy
According to the biography that Simone Tery wrote about her in 1949, when news of her death reached her home in Corsica, “the church bells rang out in every village". Her ashes were later placed in the family grave in Vistale, a hamlet near Piana where there is a memorial to her.
A heroine of French Resistance, she has lent her name to streets, schools, and colleges throughout France; notably Rue Danielle Casanova in Paris. A large SCNM ferry between Marseilles and Corsica is called MS Danielle Casanova. She has been featured on a commemorative French postage stamp in 1983.

See also
Women in the French Resistance
Rue Danielle Casanova, Paris
Convoi des 31000

Notes

References

Sources
 
 
 
 

1909 births
1943 deaths
Corsican Resistance members
French communists
French people of Corsican descent
Communist members of the French Resistance
French socialist feminists
French people who died in Auschwitz concentration camp
Deaths from typhus